John Corbett (born 1963) is an American writer, musician, radio host, teacher, record producer, concert promoter, and gallery owner based in Chicago, Illinois. He is best known among musicians and music fans as a champion of free jazz and free improvisation. In recent years he has become known in the visual art world as well through his Corbett vs. Dempsey gallery.

Corbett's activities include:
 musician playing free improvisation, usually on acoustic guitar
 staff writer for Down Beat magazine
 curator, with Ken Vandermark, of the Wednesday night jazz series at the Empty Bottle in Chicago, circa 1996–2004
 artistic director of the Berlin Jazz Festival in 2002
 record producer; he curates the Unheard Music Series for Atavistic Records, reissuing both classic and obscure recordings of free jazz and free improvisation, and has also produced new recordings by Peter Brötzmann and others
 adjunct associate professor at the School of the Art Institute of Chicago, where he has taught since 1988
 co-owner, with Jim Dempsey, of Corbett vs. Dempsey, a Chicago art gallery

For many years he hosted a radio show on WHPK called Radio Dada. More recently, he has co-hosted a jazz show called Writer's Block on WNUR with fellow jazz writers Kevin Whitehead and Lloyd Sachs.

Books
Extended Play: Sounding Off from John Cage to Dr. Funkenstein (Duke University Press, 1994)
 Sun Ra + Ayé Aton: Space, Interiors, and Exteriors (with Glenn Ligon) (Corbett vs. Dempsey, 2013)
Microgroove: Forays into Other Music (Duke University Press, 2015)
A Listener's Guide to Free Improvisation (University of Chicago Press, 2016)
Vinyl Freak: Love Letters to a Dying Medium (Duke University Press, 2017)
Pick Up the Pieces: Excursions in Seventies Music (University of Chicago Press, 2019)

Discography
 I'm Sick About My Hat
 Van's Peppy Syncopators (with Hal Rammel and Terri Kapsalis)
 The Devil's in the Details (with Hal Rammel)
 Battuto (with Mats Gustafsson, Terri Kapsalis, and Fred Lonberg-Holm)
 Humdinger (with Davey Williams)
 Sticky Tongues and Kitchen Knives (with Mats Gustafsson)
 Night People (with Sebi Tramontana et al.)

References

External links
 Corbett vs. Dempsey official site
 John Corbett official site
 John Corbett interview (BOMB Magazine) 2016
 John Corbett interview (Delmark Records) circa 2001
 John Corbett interview (Jazz Weekly) circa 2000

1963 births
Record producers from Illinois
Place of birth missing (living people)
Avant-garde jazz guitarists
Living people
Music promoters
Writers from Chicago